The guinakit, alternatively spelled as ginakit, refers to a Moro boat which was used by royalty. It was historically used to navigate the coastal and inland waters of Mindanao.

Guinakit comes from the Maguindanao word for a "convoy of boats".

A fluvial parade of guinakit is customary for the Shariff Kabunsuan Festival which commemorates the arrival of Sharif Kabungsuwan in mainland Mindanao and the introduction of Islam in the area. Kabunsuan, a missionary, is believed to have rode a guinakit. It is also the feature of the Pakaradyan Festival, a festival commemorating the establishment of the town of Malapatan in Sarangani province.

See also
Balangay
Vinta

References

Culture of Maguindanao del Norte
Culture of Maguindanao del Sur
History of Bangsamoro
Indigenous ships of the Philippines